Solveig Ingerid Gladtvet (née Olsen, December 12, 1893 –  August 4, 1951) was a Norwegian actress.

Life and career
Solveig Gladtvet was born in 1893 in Kristiania (now Oslo), Norway. She married the Norwegian filmmaker Ottar Gladtvet in 1914. She appeared in two silent films directed by her husband in the 1910s. She died in 1951.

Filmography
1913: Overfaldet paa postaapnerens datter as Ingrid Munkevold, the postman's daughter
1918: Revolutionens datter as Claire Staalhammer, the daughter of the shipyard manager

Notes

References

External links
 

1893 births
1951 deaths
Norwegian film actresses
20th-century Norwegian actresses
Actresses from Oslo